Kehinde Vaughan (born 19 December 1961) is a Nigerian sprinter. She competed in the women's 400 metres at the 1980 Summer Olympics.

References

External links
 

1961 births
Living people
Athletes (track and field) at the 1980 Summer Olympics
Athletes (track and field) at the 1988 Summer Olympics
Nigerian female sprinters
Olympic athletes of Nigeria
African Games gold medalists for Nigeria
African Games medalists in athletics (track and field)
Place of birth missing (living people)
Athletes (track and field) at the 1978 All-Africa Games
Olympic female sprinters
20th-century Nigerian women
21st-century Nigerian women
Universiade medalists in athletics (track and field)
Universiade bronze medalists for Nigeria